is a train station located in Uji, Kyoto Prefecture, Japan.

Lines
Keihan Electric Railway
Uji Line

Adjacent stations

Railway stations in Kyoto Prefecture